{{DISPLAYTITLE:C6H14N2}}
The molecular formula C6H14N2 may refer to:

 1,2-Cyclohexanediamine, a mixture of the two diastereoisomers
 trans-1,2-Diaminocyclohexane
 cis-1,2-Diaminocyclohexane
 1,5-Diazacyclooctane, a cyclic diamine